William Kerry Halligan (March 29, 1883 – January 28, 1957) was an American stage and film actor, and writer.

Halligan was born on March 29, 1883, in Chicago, Illinois. He was active on the stage from 1904 to 1919. That year he made his film debut in The Wonder Man. He appeared as a supporting actor in numerous films; his last appearance was in If I'm Lucky in 1946. He also worked as a writer and "gagman" (joke writer) from 1928 to 1943. He died at the Motion Picture County House in Woodland Hills, California on January 28, 1957.

Filmography
Partial list of films featuring William Halligan:
 The Wonder Man (1920) - Bubbles
 Waltzing Around (short) (1929) 
 Somewhere in Jersey (Vitaphone Varieties) (1929)
 Follow the Leader (1930) - Bob Sterling
 At Your Service (Vitaphone Varieties) (1930)
 The Darling Brute (Vitaphone Varieties) (1930)
 Accidents will Happen (short) (1930)
 Lady and Gent (1932) - Doc Hayes
 Story Conference (Broadway Brevities) (1934)
 Earl of Puddlestone (1940) - Henry Potter-Potter
 You Can't Fool Your Wife (1940) - J.R. Gillespie, Sr.
 Emergency Landing (1941) - George B. Lambert
 Murder Among Friends (1941) - James Gerald
 Double Cross (1941) - Mayor
 Paper Bullets (1941) - Police Chief Flynn
 Blonde Comet (1941) - Cannonball Blake
 Foreign Agent (1942) - Bob Davis
 Broadway Big Shot (1942) - Warden Collins
 A Gentleman at Heart (1942) - Higgins
 Henry Aldrich, Editor (1942) - Norman Kenly
 Riders of the Deadline (1943) - banker Simon Crandall
 Jive Junction (1943) - Mr. Maglodian
 He's My Guy (1943) - Elwood
 The Black Hills Express (1943) - Marshal Harvey Dorman
 The Seventh Victim (1943) - Paul Radeaux (uncredited)
 The Great Mike (1944) - Doc Scott
 Dick Tracy (1945) - Mayor
 Within These Walls (1945) - Collins
 Till the Clouds Roll By (1946) - Cap'n Andy

Anecdotes
Halligan enjoyed gambling, but unfortunately was noted for his inability to pick horses. One day at Santa Anita his friend, Nick the Greek, challenged him: "Bill, you're such a bad handicapper I'll bet you 100 to 1 that you can't pick a horse that will finish last." Halligan took the bet at $1000 to $10, and picked Paper Boy, an extreme longshot. Paper Boy won, and paid $64.

On another occasion Nick told Halligan: "In gambling with a Southerner, never be afraid [if] he pulls a pistol on you. It's when he pulls his fountain pen that you'd better duck."

References

External links

William Halligan at IMDb

1883 births
1957 deaths
Male actors from Chicago
American male stage actors
American male film actors